Sackbut Review was an American quarterly magazine published in Milwaukee, Wisconsin from 1978 until 1981. Founded and edited by Angela Peckenpaugh, the periodical's primary content were art, poetry, and short prose pieces.

In the 1981 Annual Report of The National Endowment for the Arts, Sackbut Review was listed as one of the recipients for "Assistance to Literary Magazines"—a category to "help nonprofit magazines finance special issues; improve format, design, production, or readership; or assist in long-range development plans."

References 

Quarterly magazines published in the United States
Magazines established in 1978
1978 establishments in Wisconsin
Magazines disestablished in 1981
1981 disestablishments in Wisconsin